Club Atlético Boston River, simply known as Boston River, is a Uruguayan sports club located in Montevideo. Founded on 20 February 1939, their main focus is on football, currently playing in the Uruguayan Primera División. At the futsal league of AUF, Boston River compete in the first division.

The club is named after a tailor shop owned by its founder, called "Sastrería Boston", and Argentine side River Plate.

Players

Current squad

On loan

Honours

National tournaments
 Liga Metropolitana Amateur (1): 2006
 Divisional Extra A (1): 1956
 Divisional Extra B (1): 1954

External links
  

Boston River
Boston River
1939 establishments in Uruguay
Boston River
Boston River